Vietnam competed at the 1996 Summer Olympics in Atlanta, United States.
The Vietnam Sports Contingent participated in Atlanta with twelve members including six athletes, four coaches and two officials in four sports disciplines: athletics, swimming, shooting and judo.

Results by event

Athletics
Men's 100m
 Lâm Hải Vân
 Round 1 — 11.14 (did not advance)

Women's 100m Hurdles
 Vũ Bích Hường → 39th place (13:85)

Judo
Women's 48 kg
 Cao Ngọc Phương Trinh → Round of 16

Shooting
Men's 50m pistol
 Trịnh Quốc Việt → 44th place (535 points)

Swimming
Men's 200m Backstroke
 Trương Ngọc Tuấn → 38th place (2:12.05)

Women's 50m Freestyle
 Võ Trần Trường An → 52nd place (29.02)

References
Official Olympic Reports

Nations at the 1996 Summer Olympics
1996
1996 in Vietnamese sport